This is a list of bottled water brands. Bottled water is drinking water (e.g., well water, distilled water, mineral water, or spring water) packaged in plastic, cartons, aluminum, or glass water bottles. Bottled water may be carbonated or not. Sizes range from small single serving bottles to large carboys for water coolers. The environmental impact of bottled water is 3,500 times that of tap-water.

Bottled water brands

 Acqua Panna
 Adelholzener Alpenquellen
 AdeS– sold only in Indonesia
 Agua Mineral Salus
 Agua Vida
 Ambo Mineral Water
 Amma Kudineer
 Antipodes Water Company
 Apenta
 Apollinaris
 Aqua Pura
 Aquafina
 Arrowhead Water
 Arwa
 Badamli
 Badoit
 Bai Brands
 Ballygowan
 Bear-lithia
 Belu
 Bílinská kyselka
 Bisleri
 Borjomi
 Buxton (UK)
 Ciego Montero
 Ciel
 Contrex
 Cool Ridge
 Crystal Clear
 Crystal Geyser Water Company
 Culligan
 Damavand Mineral Water
 Dana
 Aqua
 Dasani
 Deep River Rock
 Deep Spring
 Deer Park Spring Water
 Dejà Blue
 Donat Mg
 Ein Gedi Mineral Water
 Energy Brands
 Ethos Water
 Evian
 Farris
 Fiji Water
 Fruit2O
 Fuentealta
 Ganten
 Gerolsteiner Brunnen
 Glaceau
 Gourmet Foods
 Harrogate Spa Water
 Highland Spring
 Hiram Codd
 Ice Mountain
 Iceland Pure Spring Water
 Icelandic Glacial
 Isklar
 Jamnica
 Jana
 Jermuk
 Kellogg's Special K2O Protein Water
 Knjaz Miloš a.d.
 Liquid Death
 Lithia
 Londonderry Lithia
 Mai Dubai
 Malvern Water
 Mattoni
 Mey Eden
 Istisu
 Mohai Agnes mineral water
 Moon Fusion Water
 Mount Franklin Water
 Mountain Valley Spring Water
 Nabeglavi
 Naya Waters
 Nestlé Pure Life
 Nestlé Waters
 Nestlé Waters North America
 Neviot
 NEWater
 Nongfu Spring
 Ozarka
 Panama Blue
 Panna
 Pennine Spring
 Penta Water
 Perrier
 Pluto Water
 Poland Spring
 Powwow Water
 Princes Gate Spring Water
 Propel Fitness Water
 Pump
 Qooz
 Radenska
 Ramlösa
 Sairme
 San Mateo
 San Pellegrino
 Sanfaustino
 Selters
 Sierra Springs
 Sirab
 Sohat
 Souroti
 Spa
 Sparkletts
 Staatl. Fachingen
 Tannourine
 Himalayan
 Tau
 Tipperary Natural Mineral Water
 Topo Chico
 Trump Ice
 Tŷ Nant
 Valpre
 Verna Natural Mineral Water, sold in Ghana, Burkina Faso and Togo
 VEEN
 Vittel
 Volvic
 Voss
 Watsons Water
 Whistler Water
 Zaječická hořká
 Zephyrhills

References

Drink brands
Lists of brand name drinks